Francis Conroy Sullivan (July 2, 1882 – April 4, 1929) was a Canadian architect.

The only Canadian pupil of Frank Lloyd Wright aside from Roger d'Astous, Sullivan worked in the Oak Park studio in 1907 but returned to Ottawa in 1908. Sullivan brought the modernist Prairie School style to Canada, building a number of prominent structures, often in the Prairie Style.

Sullivan was born in Kingston, Ontario. He was an architect for the Canadian Department of Public Works from 1908 to 1911, after which he had an independent practice in Ottawa until 1916. In this capacity he frequently designed schools for the Ottawa Catholic School Board. In 1920 he moved to Chicago and became the chief architect for the Chicago Public School Board.

Examples of Sullivan's work include:

 The O'Connor Street Bridge in Ottawa, Ontario, Canada – 1907
 108 Acacia Ave., Ottawa - 1908
Gainsborough Apartments, 285-291 Metcalfe Street, Ottawa - 1911
 The Banff National Park Pavilion, (with Frank Lloyd Wright), Banff National Park, Alberta, Canada – 1911
 No 7 Fire Station Arthur St., Ottawa – 1912 
 Apartment House 204 Laurier Ave. E., Ottawa – 1913
 Ecole du Sacré Coeur (now School House Lofts), 19 Melrose Ave., Ottawa – 1912
 Pembroke Public Library, 237 Victoria St., Pembroke, Ontario, Canada – 1913
 Horticulture Building, Lansdowne Park, Ottawa – 1914
 Francis C. Sullivan House, 346 Somerset St. E., Ottawa – 1914
 Patrick J. Powers House, 178 James St., Ottawa – 1915
 Edward P. Connors House, 166 Huron Ave. N., Ottawa – 1915
 Ransome W. Dunning Residence 99 Acacia Ave., Ottawa
 Stonewall Post Office (Now a prominent antique shop and bookstore), 357 Main Street, Stonewall, Manitoba, Canada – 1915 
 Church of Ste-Claire de Goulbourne (now St. Clare's Catholic Church), near Dwyer Hill, Ontario – 1915
 St. Martin of Tours Church, Glen Robinson Ont. (Destroyed by fire in the 1950s).
 6 Allan Pl., Ottawa
 Shawville Post Office, 100 Victoria Ave., Shawville, Quebec, Canada – 1917 
 Orthopedic Hospital, North Toronto Military Hospital – 1917
 Service Storehouse North Toronto Military Hospital – 1917
 Military convalescent Home, Coburg, Ont. – 1917
 Sir Oliver Mowat Sanatorium, Kingston Ont. – 1917
 Infirmary Building, Provincial Sanatorium, Kentville N.S. – 1917
 Military Convalescent Home, Guelph, Ont. – 1917
 The Lindenlea Housing Project, Ottawa – 1919-21
 Bartholomew Armstrong Residence, 8 McLeod St., Ottawa – 1924
 Steinmetz High School, N. Mobile St. Chicago – 1925
 Calumet High School. E. May St., Chicago – 1925
 Edward J. Kelly Estate, Vilas County, near Eagle River, Wisconsin, United States – 1925

Although influenced by Wright, Sullivan's work diverged from Wright's in certain important ways. For example, whereas horizontals predominate in Wright's creations, Sullivan used strong verticals to create tension in his designs.

Sullivan went to Chandler, Arizona while in Wright's employ, and died there on April 4, 1929.

Gallery

See also 
List of designated heritage properties in Ottawa

References

Bibliography

External
 Historic Places in Canada

External links 

Prairie Styles Bio
Heritage Ottawa, "Twenty Buildings and Features On The Glebe Walking Tour"
Hintonburg Heritage Walking Tour
The Prairie School Traveler

1882 births
1929 deaths
Canadian architects
People from Kingston, Ontario
Canadian people of Irish descent